Orlando Dollente (born 24 October 1964) is a Filipino boxer. He competed in the men's featherweight event at the 1988 Summer Olympics.

References

External links
 

1964 births
Living people
Filipino male boxers
Olympic boxers of the Philippines
Boxers at the 1988 Summer Olympics
Place of birth missing (living people)
Featherweight boxers